Pere Laval R.C.A School (Ecole Père Laval RCA) is a primary school in Sainte-Croix, Port Louis District, Mauritius, Africa operated by the Le Diocèse de Port-Louis, a Catholic organization.

References

External links
Ecoles Primaires, Le Diocèse de Port-Louis, L'Église Catholique à Maurice

Schools in Mauritius
Catholic schools in Mauritius
Education in Mauritius
Educational organisations based in Mauritius
Religion in Port Louis